Torben Lendager (born 23 April 1951, Slagelse, Denmark) is a Danish singer and composer. Lendager was the lead singer of the Danish band The Walkers, and is notable for composing hit songs "Little Kitty" and "Sha-La-La-La-La", which was covered by Vengaboys as "Shalala Lala".

References 
 

Male composers
People from Slagelse
1951 births
Living people
21st-century Danish composers
21st-century Danish male singers